Émile Cousinet, (12 November 1896 – 24 October 1964) was a French film producer and film director.

Biography 
The son of a carpenter, Couzinet became a traveling projectionist and then director of the Royan Casino.

In 1930, due to the unbridled competition of the barriers of Bordeaux, he acquired his own studios, the "Studios de la Côte de Beauté", a cinema complex installed in the seaside resort of Royan. After the destruction of the city at the end of World War II, he recreated his studios in Bordeaux, which then took the name Studios de la Côte d'Argent. The infrastructures were developed near the castle Tauzin which became its main residence

He produced himself vaudevilles, of which he was also the screenwriter (occasionally under the name of Robert Eyquem) sometimes at the first degree or a little grivois, often adapted from boulevard theatre.

If comedy was his favorite field, Couzinet also touched on other genres such as swashbuckler films, literary adaptation ( after Prosper Mérimée) or family melodrama (a film for which he employed a certain Sergio Leone as an assistant.

He made famous cinema names such as Pierre Larquey, Jeanne Fusier-Gir and Gaby Morlay play in his films. But he also helped the beginnings of truculent actors such as Jean Carmet, who appeared in Mon curé champion du régiment and Robert Lamoureux, who held his own role in Le Don d'Adèle.

The Couzinet empire gradually disappeared from the late 1950s in the context of concentration of the film industry.

Filmography 

 1939: 
 1939: Le Club des fadas
 1942: 
 1943: 
 1947: Hyménée
 1948: 
 1949: 
 1950: A Hole in the Wall
 1950: 
 1951: 
 1951: 
 1951: Buridan, héros de la Tour de Nesle
 1952: Trois Vieilles Filles en folie
 1952: When Do You Commit Suicide?
 1952: 
 1953: The Cucuroux Family
 1954: Le Congrès des belles-mères
 1954: Trois jours de bringue à Paris
 1956: Mon curé champion du régiment
 1957: Trois marins en bordée
 1959: Quai des illusions
 1962: Césarin joue les étroits mousquetaires

Bibliography

References

External links 

 on BIFI 
 
 
 Blog dedicated to Émile Couzinet

French film directors
French film producers
20th-century French screenwriters
People from Gironde
1896 births
1964 deaths